The striolated tit-spinetail (Leptasthenura striolata) is a species of bird in the family Furnariidae.
It is endemic to Brazil where it is commonly known as grimpeirinho or grimpeiro because it lives mostly on the canopies (grimpa in Portuguese meaning canopy) of the Araucaria angustifolia pine tree, also endemic to the southern regions of South America.

Its natural habitats are temperate forest and subtropical or tropical moist shrubland.

See also
Azure jay (Cyanocorax caeruleus)

References

External links
Image at ADW

striolated tit-spinetail
Birds of the Atlantic Forest
Endemic birds of Brazil
striolated tit-spinetail
Taxonomy articles created by Polbot